King's Highway 17A, commonly referred to as Highway 17A or as the Kenora By-Pass, is an alternate route of Highway 17 around the city of Kenora, in the Canadian province of Ontario. It was built along a former Canadian Pacific Railway right-of-way, and has two westbound passing lanes in separate parts, and one eastbound passing lane.

Route description 
Although it is not an official part of the Trans-Canada Highway, Highway 17A is designated as the through route when travelling into Kenora on the Trans-Canada.
The road also provides access to Kenora Airport, but otherwise avoids the built-up areas of the city.
The highway passes through a heavily forested area dominated by large granite rock outcroppings, geography typical of the Canadian Shield.
On an average day approximately 3,200–5,200 vehicles travel along the road, varying by season.

History 
Construction of Highway 17A began in 1981 in response to traffic congestion within the city of Kenora, which created a severe bottleneck for cross-national traffic. The bypass opened in stages as it was constructed from west to east.
The first , from Highway 17 to Highway 596 opened in September 1983. Following this, contracts were tendered for construction of the Winnipeg River bridge.
The section between Highway 596 and Highway 658 opened several years later in the autumn of 1988.
The final section, linking Highway 658 with Highway 17, was opened on November16, 1990, at which point the Kenora Bypass was designated Highway17A.

Major intersections

References

External links 
 Highway 17A pictures and information

017A
Ontario 017A
Transport in Kenora
Ring roads in Canada
Highway 017A